The Manitoba Nurses' Union is a labour organization representing registered nurses, licensed practical nurses, registered psychiatric nurses, and operating room technicians in Manitoba, Canada.  It is affiliated with the Canadian Labour Congress, Canadian Federation of Nurses Unions and the Manitoba Council of Health Care Unions.

External links

Manitoba Nurses' Union – Canadian Labour Unions – Web Archive created by the University of Toronto Libraries

Healthcare trade unions in Canada
Nursing organizations in Canada